Phycodes is a genus of moths in the family Brachodidae.

Species
 Phycodes celebica Kallies, 1998
 Phycodes chalcocrossa Meyrick, 1909
 Phycodes chionardis Meyrick, 1909
 Phycodes interstincta Kallies & Arita, 2011
 Phycodes maculata Moore, 1881
 Phycodes minor Moore, 1881
 Phycodes penitis Diakonoff, 1978
 Phycodes punctata Walsingham, 1891
 Phycodes radiata Ochsenheimer, 1808
 Phycodes substriata Walsingham, 1891
 Phycodes taonopa Meyrick, 1909
 Phycodes tortricina Moore, 1881

Former species
 Phycodes adjectella Walker, 1863
 Phycodes albitogata Walsingham, 1891
 Phycodes bushii Arita, 1980
 Phycodes eucallynta Meyrick, 1937
 Phycodes limata Diakonoff & Arita, 1979
 Phycodes mochlophanes Meyrick, 1921
 Phycodes morosa Diakonoff, 1948
 Phycodes omnimicans Diakonoff, 1978
 Phycodes pseliota Meyrick, 1920
 Phycodes seyrigella Viette, 1955
 Phycodes superbella Rebel, 1931
 Phycodes tertiana Diakonoff, 1978
 Phycodes toulgoetella Viette, 1955
 Phycodes venerea Meyrick, 1921

References

Brachodidae